The Saskatchewan Rush are a professional box lacrosse team based in Saskatoon, Saskatchewan, Canada. Formerly the Edmonton Rush, they are members of the Western Division of the National Lacrosse League (NLL) and play their home games on Co-op Field at SaskTel Centre. The Rush have won the Champion's Cup twice since their move to Saskatchewan: their first season in 2016, and again in 2018.

History
The Edmonton Rush made their debut as an expansion team in the 2006 NLL season and twice reached the NLL final. After losing in 2012, they won the Champion's Cup in 2015. However, the team struggled to draw fans, faced competition from the Edmonton Oil Kings junior hockey team for fans, and were denied the ability to promote the Rush branding within Rexall Place by the Edmonton Oilers. Lacking any agreement with the City of Edmonton to play at its replacement, Rogers Place, owner Bruce Urban opted to relocate for the 2016 NLL season.

In 2017, the team reached a five-year sponsorship deal with Saskatoon Co-op, under which the team's venue is referred to as Co-op Field at SaskTel Centre during Rush games.

On May 10, 2021, the team announced that it had been sold to Mike Priestner, owner of the Saskatoon Blades of the Western Hockey League.

Current roster

All-time record 

*2020 season ended in March 2020 because of COVID-19
**Before the 2022 season Derek Keenan stepped down as head coach. New hire Jeff McComb would go on to be fired mid-season. General Manager Derek Keenan and Offensive Coach Jimmy Quinlan became associate head coaches.

Playoff results

Head coaching history
Note: This list does not include head coaches from the Edmonton Rush.

Draft history

NLL Entry Draft 
First Round Selections

 2015: None
 2016: Ryan Keenan (1st overall), Michael Messenger (3rd overall) 
 2017: None
 2018: Connor Robinson (5th overall)
 2019: Holden Garlent (4th overall), Justin Robinson (9th overall), Tanner Thomson (16th overall) 
 2020: Marshall Powless (7th overall), Connor McClelland (12th overall) 
 2021: Jake Boudreau (7th overall), Ryan Barnable (8th overall)

Broadcasting 
The Rush reached deals with Saskatoon Media Group's CKBL-FM and SaskTel to broadcast its 2016 playoff games. In the subsequent season, the team began to carry radio broadcasts of all games on its sister station CJMK-FM, with Tanner Fetch as play-by-play announcer. The team returned to CKBL-FM for 2018–19 with Dave Thomas as the radio voice of the Rush.

As part of its exclusive broadcast rights to the league in the 2018–19 season, all Rush telecasts moved to the streaming service B/R Live, with Ryan Flaherty on play-by-play, former Vancouver Stealth play-by-play announcer Jake Elliott on colour, and local radio personality Daniella Ponticelli as reporter. As of the 2022 season, TSN carries all Rush games on either television or streaming as part of its national broadcast rights to the NLL.

References

External links
Official Website

 
Lacrosse teams in Saskatchewan
Sport in Saskatoon
National Lacrosse League teams
2015 establishments in Saskatchewan